The 1980 Colgate Series Championships was a women's tennis tournament played on indoor carpet courts at the Capital Centre in Landover, Maryland in the United States that was the season-ending tournament of the 1980 Colgate World Championship Series. The eight singles players with the most ranking points qualified for the tournament. It was the fourth edition of the tournament and was held from January 7 through January 12, 1981. Tracy Austin won the singles title and earned $75,000 first-prize money.

Finals

Singles
 Tracy Austin defeated  Andrea Jaeger 6–2, 6–2

Doubles
 Rosemary Casals /  Wendy Turnbull defeated  Candy Reynolds /  Paula Smith 6–3, 4–6, 7–6(7–5)

Prize money 

Doubles prize money is per team.

See also
 1980 Avon Championships

References

External links
 International Tennis Federation (ITF) tournament edition details

Virginia Slims of Washington
1980 in sports in Maryland
1980 in American tennis
Tennis in Maryland